KXTX-TV (channel 39) is a television station licensed to Dallas, Texas, United States, serving as the Dallas–Fort Worth market's outlet for the Spanish-language network Telemundo. It is owned and operated by NBCUniversal's Telemundo Station Group alongside Fort Worth–licensed NBC outlet KXAS-TV (channel 5). Both stations share studios at the CentrePort Business Park in Fort Worth, while KXTX-TV's transmitter is located in Cedar Hill, Texas.

History

Early history
The station first signed on the air on February 5, 1968, under the call sign KDTV. The station was founded by Trigg-Vaughn, the original applicant of the construction permit to build its broadcasting facilities; the permit was subsequently acquired by Doubleday Broadcasting; the company eventually moved its headquarters from New York City to Dallas on June 18, 1969, with KDTV serving as the company's flagship television property. Channel 39 operated from a state-of-the-art studio facility located at 3900 Harry Hines Boulevard, near downtown Dallas, which cost $3 million to build.

Originally operating as an independent station, the station carried the Stock Market Observer, a daytime business news programming block that aired each weekday morning and afternoon from 7:00 a.m. to 5:00 p.m. (the format was first used in the market by KAEI-TV (channel 29, allocation now occupied by Estrella TV owned-and-operated station KMPX-TV) during that station's single year of operation in 1964); it also carried a broad mix of general entertainment programming during the late-afternoon and evening hours, consisting of a mix of feature films, off-network syndicated programs, sporting events as well as Japanese cartoons dubbed into English (including Speed Racer and Johnny Cypher in Dimension Zero). It also carried some local programming including the public affairs program 3900 Harry Hines, cooking show The Gourmet (which originated on CBS affiliate KDFW-TV (channel 4, now a Fox owned-and-operated station) before moving to KDTV in October 1971) and children's program The Bozo Show (a localized version of the Bozo the Clown franchise featuring a mix of locally produced and syndicated segments).

On May 7, 1969, KDTV's transmitter tower in Cedar Hill collapsed after hit by straight-line winds during a severe thunderstorm; the collapse effectively knocked the station off the air for twelve days, before improvising a temporary transmitter. The station later constructed a new tower at a cost of $450,000, resuming full-power transmissions on October 30 of that year.

Christian Broadcasting Network ownership

In June 1973, after substantial financial losses and a failed sale attempt, Doubleday announced that it was seeking to donate KDTV to a non-profit organization. Doubleday attempted to donate it to three different non-profit interests—Area Education Television Foundation, Inc., the Dallas Independent School District (both of which owned PBS member station KERA-TV (channel 13) at the time) and Berean Fellowship International (whose KBFI-TV (channel 33, allocation now occupied by The CW affiliate KDAF) had closed for financial reasons just six months prior). However, neither entity accepted Doubleday's offer, as the terms of the donation proposal required the prospective owner to assume a large amount of KDTV's debt and its programming commitments.

Doubleday would ultimately find an organization willing to acquire the Channel 39 license and assets when it was approached by the Christian Broadcasting Network. CBN had just entered the Dallas television market by buying KBFI-TV from Berean and returning it to the air in April as independent station KXTX-TV. On June 27, CBN announced that it had been chosen to take on the KDTV facilities, programming and contractual obligations, and channel 39 license; Pat Robertson estimated the network would pay $2.9 million over 10 years, nearly half of that in film contracts from KDTV, and announced its plans to merge KXTX-TV's staff and programming with that of KDTV. CBN agreed to Doubleday's proposal to donate Channel 39's programming inventory and broadcast license to CBN on November 9, 1973. Four days after CBN acquired ownership of the license, on November 14, channel 33 shut down. The KXTX-TV call letters, staff and programming moved from channel 33 to channel 39. KXTX-TV became a full-time commercial independent station.

As was the structure of CBN's other independent stations, KXTX maintained a format consisting primarily of religious programs as well as some secular general entertainment programming. By this point, its slate of secular content – comprising about twelve hours of its daily schedule each weekday and Saturday—consisted of off-network classic sitcoms (such as The Brady Bunch, McHale's Navy and The Andy Griffith Show); drama series (such as Star Trek); cartoons (such as Tom and Jerry and Looney Tunes animated shorts, Scooby-Doo, The Jetsons, Jonny Quest and The Flintstones); a variety of classic movies from the 1930s, 1940s and 1950s; and westerns. Local programming on KXTX included Reflect, a public affairs talk show co-hosted by Don Hall and Durline Dunham, which aired every Sunday evening at 6:30 and 11:00 p.m. It also ran religious programs for about five hours per day during the week and throughout its Sunday schedule; the CBN-produced variety/talk show, The 700 Club, also aired on the station three times per day each weekday.

While KXTX-TV operated as a conventional independent station by this time its programming policy was decidedly conservative, in keeping with the ministry's Baptist/charismatic religious views. Secular programming acquired for the station's schedule was specifically chosen to contain minimal to no sexual content, overt violence, depictions of the occult, or strong profanity; for many years, any dialogue containing profanity within its programs were muted, and episodes of syndicated programs that contained subject matter that did not fit CBN's content standards were occasionally replaced with other episodes. In 1977, CBN began attempts to establish regional distribution of its independent stations via cable television amid the growing success of Atlanta independent WTCG (later WTBS, and now the separate WPCH-TV within Atlanta and the cable-originated TBS nationwide) that followed Ted Turner's December 1976 expansion of that station into a national satellite-delivered superstation. From that point onward, KXTX's signal was being imported by several cable systems in other media markets throughout the South Central United States—with its distribution being concentrated mainly in other portions of Texas outside the main broadcast signal's coverage area as well as systems in Oklahoma, Louisiana and Arkansas—as a regional superstation. By the end of the 1970s, KXTX maintained an approximately 20-hour-a-day programming schedule, with secular programming encompassing around 15 hours of its Monday through Saturday lineup. In September 1980, KXTX reduced its lineup of religious programming on Sundays from that day's entire schedule to two separate blocks from 6:00 to 10:00 a.m. and 7:00 p.m. to midnight, with secular shows being incorporated to fill out the schedule on Sunday afternoons.

For its first three decades as an independent station, KXTX ranked behind rival independent KTVT (channel 11) in the ratings. However, by 1983, the station's competitors began overextending themselves to acquire the strongest programming. KTXA (channel 21) converted into a full-time general entertainment station in September of that year, after discontinuing its nighttime-only affiliation with ONTV; KNBN-TV on Channel 33 shifted from a part-time business news and general entertainment format to a full-time entertainment-based station as KRLD-TV, and began to feature a strong inventory of programming by 1986; KDFI-TV (channel 27) also adopted a full-time general entertainment format in 1984. As a result, KXTX shifted its programming focus away from cartoons and classic sitcoms, and more toward westerns, family-oriented drama series and movies. Also around this time, many cable providers outside of the Dallas–Fort Worth Metroplex began to drop the station, in order to avoid copyright payment liability amid the Copyright Royalty Tribunal's January 1983 establishment of a 3.75% royalty fee—based on a cable system's gross receipts from subscribers—for any distant signals carried by their local system. Many of the providers that dropped KXTX elected to keep rival independent KTVT, which had started to be offered as a regional superstation around the same time KXTX was, and would begin transmitting via satellite by way of Tulsa, Oklahoma-based United Video Satellite Group in July 1984. KXTX, meanwhile, continued to see its regional distribution gradually decline until its signal ceased being imported outside the Dallas–Fort Worth DMA entirely in 1986.

In the spring of 1986, KXTX reached an agreement with WFAA-TV (channel 8) to carry ABC prime time programming preempted by that station in favor of locally produced specials, breaking news coverage or feature films scheduled by WFAA for the purpose of makegood sales to local advertisers; this arrangement was short-lived, as a result of a situation on April 16 of that year, in which WFAA (by way of cooperation with KXTX management) had to delay a scheduled movie telecast to air an ABC News special report on President Ronald Reagan's prime time address regarding the U.S. military's missile strikes on Libya. In April 1986, the Christian Broadcasting Network announced that it would sell its independent stations—KXTX, WXNE-TV in Boston, and WYAH-TV in Portsmouth, Virginia; however, the ministry was ultimately unable to find a buyer for KXTX. The station began broadcasting infomercials during the morning and overnight hours by 1990.

By the early 1990s, KXTX's schedule consisted mostly of paid programming and some religious programs, a limited number of drama series, westerns, and low-budget movies. For years, KXTX was known in the Dallas-Fort Worth market for its "Western Weekends", a weekly lineup of classic westerns from the 1950s through the 1970s that aired during the afternoon and early evening hours on Saturday and Sundays—which included among others The Lone Ranger, The Rifleman, Bonanza, Rawhide, Little House on the Prairie, Gunsmoke and The Big Valley—with movies based on these shows often airing on weekend evenings (writer/director, and former Dallas resident, Mike Judge added several references to the "Channel 39" weekend Kung Fu programming in his 1999 movie Office Space).

In the spring of 1993, LIN Broadcasting assumed management responsibilities for Channel 39 under a local marketing agreement. Under this agreement, Fort Worth-based NBC affiliate KXAS-TV (channel 5)—which LIN owned at the time—began pooling some first-run syndicated programs seen on KXAS for broadcast on KXTX and allowed it to air rebroadcasts of KXAS's 6:00 and 10:00 p.m. newscasts. In addition, during the mid- to late 1990s, KXTX also aired the first few hours of the Jerry Lewis MDA Labor Day Telethon on the Sunday night before Labor Day from 8:00 until KXAS took over carriage of the broadcast at 11:00 p.m.

On September 14, 1994, Gaylord Broadcasting reached an affiliation agreement with CBS, under which rival independent KTVT take over as the network's Dallas–Fort Worth affiliate, in exchange for also switching its sister independent station in Tacoma, Washington, KSTW (now a CW owned-and-operated station), to the network. The agreement superseded an existing contract that Gaylord had reached to affiliate KTVT with The WB, whose majority owner Time Warner would file an injunction in an attempt to dissolve its existing agreement with that group for KTVT, KSTW and KHTV (now CW affiliate KIAH) in Houston (the latter of which would ultimately join the network when it launched). The WB later reached an affiliation agreement with KDAF, which Fox Television Stations had announced it would sell as a result of an agreement that the Fox Broadcasting Company reached with New World Communications, which acquired CBS affiliate KDFW in a four-station deal from Argyle Television Holdings (along with fellow CBS affiliate KTBC-TV in Austin, ABC affiliate KTVI in St. Louis and NBC affiliate WVTM-TV in Birmingham, the latter of which was exempted from the New World-Fox agreement) for $717 million on May 26.

Since KDAF could not join the network until KDFW's affiliation contract with CBS expired and Fox moved its programming to that station, The WB entered into a temporary affiliation arrangement with KXTX-TV, under which it would serve as the network's Metroplex charter affiliate in the interim until Fox Television Stations' sale of KDAF to Renaissance Communications was finalized and the Fox affiliation concurrently moved to KDFW. Channel 39 became the market's WB affiliate at the network's launch on January 11, 1995. Since The WB initially aired only one night of programming each week for the first nine months of its existence (airing on Wednesdays), KXTX was still essentially programmed as a de facto independent station, continuing to air movies in prime time on other nights during the week and series on Saturdays and Sundays.

Fox's prime time and sports programming moved from KDAF to KDFW on July 2, 1995, with the CBS affiliation concurrently moving to KTVT; three days later on July 5, KDAF (which later came under Renaissance ownership on July 9) officially took over the WB affiliation, rendering KXTX as a true independent once again. That August, KXTX entered into a programming arrangement with KTVT, under which it would serve as a backup carrier of CBS programs on dates when KTVT was scheduled to air Major League Baseball game telecasts involving the Texas Rangers that forced their preemptions from their recommended time slots on the latter station.

On October 12, 1996, an accident caused by a crew conducting maintenance on the structure resulted in the collapse of the station's  transmitter tower in Cedar Hill. KXTX and three local FM radio stations were briefly knocked off the air before the stations improvised temporary transmitter facilities, where they operated from for many months; KXTX's interim transmitter was located at the nearby tower belonging to KXAS, while the radio stations built their facilities on other existing towers nearby.

For a time in 1997, KXTX started airing the NBC soap opera Another World at 3 p.m. after the show was displaced from its 2 p.m. slot on KXAS in favor of Sunset Beach, another NBC soap opera. It was also due to the fact that KXAS also had to fulfill an obligation with one of its syndication partners at 3 p.m.

On October 23, 1997, as part of LIN Television's acquisition by Dallas-based investment firm Hicks, Muse, Tate & Furst, LIN contributed the sale of a 76% majority equity interest in KXAS-TV to a joint venture with NBC Inc., which in turn would contribute a 24% share of San Diego owned-and-operated station KNSD to Hicks Muse, predicated on the firm acquiring and closing on its deal with LIN. The takeover and joint venture deals were completed on March 2, 1998, when NBC and LIN formally established Station Venture Holdings, L.P. to serve as the licensee of KXAS and KNSD. Through NBC's assumption of majority interest over KXAS, the station terminated its LMA with KXTX.

Sale to Southwest Sports and aborted sale to Pappas Telecasting
In June 2000, Southwest Sports Television – a subsidiary of the Southwest Sports Group, a holding company founded by Texas Rangers and Dallas Stars owner Thomas O. Hicks – announced that it would purchase KXTX from the Christian Broadcasting Network outright for $1 million. At the time of the sale, KXTX had been CBN's sole remaining commercial television property for several years; because its television properties had grown too profitable to remain under the CBN banner without endangering the ministry's non-profit status (federal regulations enforced by the Internal Revenue Service prohibit non-profit organizations from owning for-profit entities that account for a substantial portion of its activities), CBN spun off The Family Channel to International Family Entertainment in 1990, and had begun a gradual sell-off of its four independent stations in 1984, when it sold WANX-TV (now CBS affiliate WANF) in Atlanta to Tribune Broadcasting. Hicks had maintained a programming agreement with KXTX since 1995, intending to build a sports network around the teams he acquired beginning that year and to better monetize their television rights. The sale came after Southwest Sports Group sold the television rights to the Rangers and Stars to regional sports network Fox Sports Net Southwest.

One month later in July 2000, Hicks announced that it would subsequently sell KXTX for $85.55 million to Pappas Telecasting Companies, which had formed a partnership with Mexico City-based broadcaster TV Azteca to launch a Spanish language television network, to be known as Azteca América. Upon that disclosure in its FCC purchase application, CBN founder Pat Robertson included a stipulation in the Pappas sale agreement that required the group to broadcast the station's programming entirely in English until May 31, 2001 with an opt-out clause that could be exercised on December 31, 2000 (Robertson had long endorsed, particularly through his Christian Coalition of America organization, that English should be the official language of the United States), and required Hicks to lease an hour of airtime on KXTX each weekday morning to CBN-produced programming, including The 700 Club (a stipulation similar to that which CBN imposed on the cable channel now known as Freeform to its subsequent owners following the sale to IFE).

Plans for KXTX under Pappas called for it to serve as the flagship station of Azteca América and base the network's technical operations center at its studios, where the network's programming, promotions and commercial spots would be automatically fed to its affiliates. These plans were aborted, when the Pappas-Azteca venture scaled back their plans for the network after failing to secure financing from lenders to purchase KXTX, as well as stations in Phoenix and El Paso, an issue blamed on the slowdown of the global economy at that time as well as technical issues that delayed the sign-on of the venture's Los Angeles station, KAZA-TV, and the December 2000 purchase of USA Broadcasting's independent and Home Shopping Network-affiliated television stations by Univision Communications, which prevented the network from initially obtaining charter stations in thirteen major markets, among them, competing independent station KSTR-TV (channel 49).

As a Telemundo owned-and-operated station

On June 27, 2001, Southwest Sports Television announced that it would sell KXTX to the Telemundo Communications Group, which later disclosed in FCC filings released that August that it acquired the station for $65 million. More than three months later on October 11, NBC Inc. purchased Telemundo from a consortium of Sony Pictures Entertainment, Liberty Media, and private equity firms BV Capital, Bastion Capital and Council Tree Communications for $1.98 billion (increasing to $2.68 billion before the sale's closure) and the assumption of $700 million in debt, including the existing sale agreement for KXTX in the transaction. The deal in effect, ironically, made KXTX and KXAS sister stations again, this time under common ownership, creating the Dallas–Fort Worth market's third television station duopoly (after CBS owned-and-operated station KTVT and then-UPN affiliate KTXA, and Univision owned-and-operated station KUVN and KSTR-TV, the latter of which became a charter affiliate of TeleFutura on January 14, 2002). While Telemundo already had an affiliate in KFWD (channel 52, now a SonLife Broadcasting Network affiliate), which had carried the network since it signed on in September 1988, the network had been looking to buy a station in what had become the eighth-largest media market in terms of overall Hispanic population.

In September 2001, Hicks announced plans to consolidate the roughly $190 million of debt owed by the Stars, the Rangers and KXTX (the latter of which comprised about $50 million of the debt owed by Southwest Sports Group) as part of a corporate refinancing that would repackage the debt into a single loan. In November of that year, KXTX began airing a handful of episodes of several older westerns from the 1950s (such as Jim Bowie) in repeat blocks, as well as marathons of B-movies featured on the film showcase Off Beat Cinema during the station's final weeks as an English language outlet.

KXTX became an owned-and-operated station of the Spanish language network on January 1, 2002; KFWD subsequently became an English-language independent station (the station would eventually revert to a Spanish language programming format in August 2012, as a charter affiliate of MundoFox). Following the sale's closure, KXTX also integrated its operations into KXAS's Broadcast Hill studio facilities on Barnett Street in eastern Fort Worth. After KXTX switched to Telemundo, many of the western series that were previously on the station's schedule found a home in the Dallas–Fort Worth market for a time on Pax TV (now Ion Television) owned-and-operated station KPXD-TV (channel 68). The rest of KXTX's meager programming inventory was acquired by KFWD, which also purchased the rights to some of KSTR-TV's syndicated programming in the run-up to its concurrent conversion into a TeleFutura O&O.

On November 19, 2009, a fire in the electrical room of the station's Broadcast Hill studios knocked both stations off the air. Fire alarms were activated throughout the facility at 9:30 p.m. that evening, which resulted in staff members being evacuated from the studio; this resulted in the disruption of that evening's scheduled broadcasts of the 10:00 p.m. newscasts seen respectively on KXAS and KXTX.

In June 2012, NBCUniversal announced plans to construct a new  facility in Fort Worth (located at the CentrePort Business Park on the former site of Amon Carter Field) to house KXAS, KXTX and NBCUniversal's other Dallas-based operations (including the Dallas news bureau operated by NBC News). Construction of the facility began that month, and was completed in September 2013, with the building formally opening on September 30. The facility incorporates four production studios; three control rooms that relay high definition content; a combined media asset management center and newsroom production suite for managing and editing content; the station's traffic and sales departments, which were previously in separate areas of the Broadcast Hill studios, were also placed adjacent to the newsroom. The sales and marketing departments of the television stations, and NBC's ArtWorks graphics firm began migrating their operations to the facility in early October of that year; all other operations—including the news departments of KXAS and KXTX—moved to the Carter Boulevard studio by November 1, ending KXAS's 65-year tenure at Broadcast Hill.

Digital television

Digital channels
The station's digital signal is multiplexed:

KXTX-TV also has plans to operate a Mobile DTV feed of digital subchannel 39.1.

Analog-to-digital conversion
KXTX began transmitting a digital television signal on UHF channel 40 on August 1, 2002. KXTX-TV shut down its analog signal, over UHF channel 39, at 10:35 p.m. on June 12, 2009, as part of the federally mandated transition from analog to digital television. The station's digital signal remained on its pre-transition UHF channel 40; independent station KLDT (virtual channel 55, now Azteca América affiliate KAZD) moved its digital signal to KXTX's former channel 39 allocation at the same time, using PSIP to display KXTX-TV's virtual channel as 39 on digital television receivers.

Programming

Sports programming
As KDTV, the station also held broadcast rights to games from the Dallas Blackhawks and Fort Worth Wings hockey, Dallas-Fort Worth Spurs baseball, Dallas Tornado soccer and Dallas Chaparrals basketball teams. It also broadcast the Dallas Cowboys football game review program The Frank Glieber Cowboys Report, hosted by the team's color commentator, from 1968 to 1970. As KXTX, during the late 1980s, the station took over the rights to the two-hour weekly wrestling program Championship Sports, which had aired Saturday nights on KTVT since the mid-1970s and also carried the syndicated version of the World Class Championship Wrestling's weekly program (KTVT concurrently aired the locally produced version of the program, Saturday Night Wrestling).

In August 1995, as part of the same agreement that allowed it to carry CBS programs seen on that station, KXTX entered into a sports programming arrangement with KTVT, in which the station would carry select Texas Rangers Major League Baseball games that were produced by and contracted to air on Channel 11, but could not be carried by that station due to a clause in the station's affiliation contract with CBS that limited the number of programming preemptions it could make on an annual basis. KXTX obtained the exclusive local over-the-air broadcast rights to the Rangers beginning with the 1996 season, through the same deal with Southwest Sports Group that included the formation of its local marketing agreement with the Christian Broadcasting Network. Most of the team's KXTX telecasts that were held in prime time and weekend daytime slots were syndicated to minor network affiliates and independent stations throughout the South Central United States through the Rangers' regional television network.

After Thomas Hicks acquired that team, Channel 39 also took over the local rights to televise National Hockey League (NHL) games featuring the Dallas Stars during the 1999–2000 season, assuming the over-the-air rights from rival independent station KDFI. The station carried at least 28 regular season games as well as two preseason games involving the Stars, with play-by-play audio of the telecasts bring simulcast on news-talk radio station WBAP (820 AM). KXTX lost the rights to both Hicks-owned teams after the Rangers' 1999–2000 season and the Stars' 2000 regular season, after Southwest Sports sold the regional television rights to both teams to Fox Sports Southwest under a 15-year broadcast contract with the regional sports network worth $515 million.

News operation
, KXTX-TV presently broadcasts 14½ hours of locally produced newscasts each week (with 2½ hours on weekdays, and one hour each on Saturdays and Sundays). In addition, the station produces the half-hour entertainment and lifestyle program Acceso Total, which airs on weekday mornings and the half-hour public affairs program Enfoque T39 (a local version of Telemundo's Sunday morning talk show Enfoque), which airs on Sunday mornings.

As an independent station, from 1981 to 1985, KXTX aired 60-second live news and weather updates, branded as the Update News, that aired during commercial breaks within the station's daytime and evening programming on the station. In September 1993, following its entrance into the local marketing agreement between the Christian Broadcasting Network and LIN Broadcasting, the station began airing rebroadcasts of NBC affiliate KXAS-TV's 6:00 and 10:00 p.m. newscasts on a half-hour delay (at 6:30 and 10:30 p.m.); the rebroadcasts were discontinued in March 1998, following the termination of the LMA.

After Telemundo Communications Group acquired KXTX, the company chose to invest in the creation of a news department for KXTX in preparation for the station's conversion into a Telemundo O&O. The news operation formally launched on May 6, 2002, with the debut of half-hour Spanish language newscasts at 5:00 and 10:00 p.m. each weeknight. Since the news department launched, KXTX has traditionally placed second to Univision owned-and-operated station KUVN among the Dallas-Fort Worth market's Spanish language newscasts. Following the imposition of company-wide budget reductions by NBC Universal in 2006, Telemundo converted KXTX's production facilities within the Broadcast Hill complex into a production hub that would assume production responsibilities for local newscasts aired by several of its sister owned-and-operated stations in the Southwestern U.S., including KVDA in San Antonio and KTMD in Houston. The move resulted in Telemundo shutting down the in-house news department operated by the affected Telemundo O&Os in 2007, with the locally produced news programs being replaced by a regional newscast produced out of the Fort Worth facility. The hubbing of local news production by Telemundo Stations Group attracted criticism from the National Association of Hispanic Journalists, including formal statements against NBC Universal decrying the move.

NBCUniversal would reverse course in 2010, due to conditions it agreed upon to the FCC while seeking approval of its then-ongoing acquisition by Comcast, when it began resuming in-house news production at the affected stations as part of a clause in the agreement to make improvements in its stations' news operations through a benefits package by NBCUniversal. On February 1, when news production resumed at KTMD and San Francisco sister station KSTS, KXTX launched an early-evening newscast at 5:00 p.m. weeknights, replacing network programming during that half-hour; in addition, the 10:00 p.m. newscast was reformatted to focus upon a single topic among the day's headlines in-depth, in addition to featuring short-form news reports.

KXTX increased its local programming production during the fall of 2011, as part of Telemundo Station Group's group-wide expansion of local news and public affairs programming across its owned-and-operated stations. On September 25, 2011, the station premiered Enfoque T39, a half-hour Sunday morning program focusing on political and other civic issues affecting North Texas' Latino and Hispanic community. Then on November 5, KXTX launched weekend evening editions of its local newscasts at 5:00 and 10:00 p.m. on Saturday and Sunday nights (the newscasts were then branded as Noticeiro Telemundo Dallas, which remained in use until the station restored the previous "Telemundo 39" brand in 2012).

Coinciding with the commencement of local programming production at The Studios at DFW facility, KXTX began broadcasting its newscasts and other local programs in high definition on September 30, 2013, becoming the second Spanish-language station and the seventh (and last) television station overall in the Dallas-Fort Worth market to begin broadcasting their newscasts in the format. On September 18, 2014, KXTX premiered a half-hour newscast at 4:30 p.m., one of several Telemundo O&Os that launched expanded late-afternoon newscasts during the 2014–15 season that included an overall revamp of the network's daytime schedule to accommodate the programs.

In popular culture
 The 2000 comedy film Miss Congeniality, which was set around an undercover operation during a beauty pageant in Texas, featured a fictional depiction of KXTX incorporating a microphone containing a flag bearing the station's 1995 to 2001 logo in a scene in which the film's character Stan Fields (played by William Shatner) is interviewed by a reporter from the station. However at the time of the film's release, the station did not air any news programming (its news department would not be formed for another two years).

References

External links
  – KXTX
 Telemundo website
 TeleXitos website
 DFW Radio/TV History

Television channels and stations established in 1968
Telemundo Station Group
Television stations in the Dallas–Fort Worth metroplex
Spanish-language television stations in Texas
1968 establishments in Texas
TeleXitos affiliates
Former General Electric subsidiaries